Turnera scabra is a species of Turnera from  Central to South America.

References

External links

scabra
Flora of Puerto Rico
Flora without expected TNC conservation status